Socialist realism in Poland was a socio-political and aesthetic doctrine enforced by the pro-Soviet communist government in the process of Stalinization of the post-war Polish People’s Republic. The official policy was introduced in 1949 by a decree of the Polish United Workers' Party minister (later, Minister of Culture and Art) Włodzimierz Sokorski. As in all Soviet-dominated Eastern Bloc countries, Socialist realism became the main instrument of political control in the building of totalitarianism in Poland. However, the trend never became truly dominant. Following Bierut's death on March 12, 1956, and the subsequent De-Stalinization of all People's Republics, Polish artists, writers and architects started abandoning it around 1956. The De-Stalinization process peaked during the Polish October.

History

The policy was enforced in Poland between 1949 and 1956 amidst the wave of human rights abuses committed by the Ministry of Public Security (secret police/intelligence). It involved all domains of cultural politics including visual, music and literary arts, though its most spectacular achievements were made in the field of architecture. The objectives of this new trend were explained in a 1949 resolution of the National Council of Party Architects. Architecture was declared a key weapon in the creation of a new social order. It was intended to help spread the communist ideology by influencing citizens' consciousness as well as their outlook on life.

During this massive undertaking, a crucial role fell to designers perceived not as merely architects creating streets and edifices, but rather as "engineers of the human soul". The idea extended beyond aesthetics and into principles of urban design meant to express grandiose expectations and arouse feelings of stability and political power monopoly in Stalinist Poland.

Local characteristics

Since the style of the Renaissance was generally regarded as the most revered in old Polish architecture, it was to become Poland's socialist national format. However, in the course of incorporating these principles into new ideology, major changes were also introduced. One of these was to more closely reflect Soviet architecture, which resulted in the majority of new buildings blending into one another. The all-encompassing Stalinist vision propagated by the Soviet Union was best exemplified by the new Joseph Stalin Palace of Culture and Science (Pałac Kultury i Nauki imienia Józefa Stalina) constructed in Warsaw between 1952 and 1955. Its design was based on similar skyscrapers built in the USSR at that time. The 3,500 builders were brought in directly from the Soviet Union with their own blueprints, and housed in a suburban shantytown.

The monumental form disseminated by the Communist Government reached its apogee with the construction of an entire new town near Kraków along with a steel mill soon to become the biggest in Poland. Nowa Huta was centrally planned as a major new centre of heavy industry, against substantial resistance from middle-class Cracovians. Its Main Square (Plac Centralny) was surrounded by huge blocks of flats populated by a new class of industrial workers employed at the Lenin Steelworks. Notably, the socrealist centre of Nowa Huta is currently considered a monument of architecture. Other prominent examples of urban design included Marszałkowska Housing Estate (MDM) in Warsaw, Kościuszkowska Housing Estate (KDM) in Wrocław, Main Station Gdynia Główna, a housing estate in Kowary, and the Palace of Coal-Basin Culture in Dąbrowa Górnicza.

Painting and sculpture

Socialist realism in Polish art was confined to portraits of party leaders and various depictions of muscular labourers and battle scenes, with special attention paid to popular taste. Formally inspired by Neoclassicism as well as the local folk art, socrealism served strictly political and pro-Soviet propaganda purposes; however, its most notable artists, such as Wojciech Weiss and Włodzimierz Zakrzewski were educated before Stalinism and inadvertently adhered to traditional Western techniques and technologies. Some of the most blatantly socrealist paintings were: "Pass-on the brick" (Podaj cegłę) pictured here, by Aleksander Kobzdej, and "Thank you tractor operator" (Podziękowanie traktorzyście) pictured here, as well as "Comrade Bierut among labourers" (Towarzysz Bierut wśród robotników) by Helena and Juliusz Krajewski.

In sculpture, there was a trend toward stone-carved allegories elevating the common worker, used mainly for architectural purposes, such as those surrounding the Palace of Culture and Science in Warsaw, including mostly plaster busts of communist apparatchiks. The collection of Polish socrealist sculpture is exhibited at Kozłówka Palace near Lubartów.

Film and music

While the socialist realism doctrine in Soviet cinema originated around the time of the Bolshevik Revolution (Eisenstein, Dovzhenko, Pudovkin) and reached its peak in the 1930s, it did not have sufficient time to develop in postwar Poland. Therefore, the cult of the communist party remained alien to the local film industry. Among the more creative Polish films loosely adhering to principles of socialist realism were Celuloza by Jerzy Kawalerowicz, Pokolenie by Andrzej Wajda and Piątka z ulicy Barskiej by Aleksander Ford. The ideological stereotype gave birth to some inferior productions as well, such as Uczta Baltazara by Jerzy Zarzycki and Jerzy Passendorfer.

In music, the trend was limited to art song, film soundtrack, and pop-song based on local folk tradition. Communist ideals were glorified in lyrics. Among the prominent composers were Jan Maklakiewicz: "Śląsk pracuje i śpiewa" (Silesia Works and Sings), Alfred Gradstein: "Na prawo most, na lewo most" (A Bridge on the Right, and a Bridge on the Left), and Andrzej Panufnik: "Symfonia Pokoju" (The Symphony to Peace). Widely promoted popular songs included "O Nowej to Hucie piosenka" (This Song is about Nowa Huta) featured here with the video. The song is still well remembered by most Polish people of the older generation.

Following Stalin's death, and especially from 1953 on, critical opinions were heard with increasing frequency. Finally, as part of the Gomułka political thaw from within the Polish United Workers' Party, the entire doctrine was officially given up in 1956.

See also
 Real socialism concept of the Brezhnev era

References

Further reading
 Socrealism - history, theory, list of publications, references and legal documents. 
 Paweł Chmielewski, Socrealist art, architecture and literature in the People's Republic of Poland 
 Ideological literary front of socrealism: Broniewski, Mayakovsky, Pasternak.
 
 
 Polish Music Center, University of Southern California: Jan Maklakiewicz, biography. See also: Polish composers.

External links

 Socialist Realism page at Marxists.org
 Palace of Culture and Science, Warsaw
 Palace of Coal-Basin Culture in Dąbrowa Górnicza
 Wojciech Weiss Muzeum Foundation
 Top 10 Socialist Realist Architectural Sculptures in Warsaw

Cultural history of Poland
Poland
Polish People's Republic
Stalinism in Poland